Pascale Mussard (née Siegrist, born 15 September 1957) is a descendant of Thierry Hermès; and the co-artistic director of Hermès, the French luxury goods company.

Early life and career
In her youth, Mussard defied the ban against family members' spending extensive time in the ateliers of Hermès. She was interested in science and often visited the Cité des Sciences et de l'Industrie in Paris's Parc de la Villette. Her first internship was at a ball mill in Germany.

After studying law and business at the European Business School London, she worked in the export department of a commercial printer. Her uncle, Jean-Louis Dumas, the head of the firm as well as the artistic director, recognized her talent and abilities. In 1978, he arranged for her to be a Poisson Pilote in the Nicole de Vésian styling agency. (Poisson Pilote, or "pilot fish" in English, is someone who leads the way under delicate circumstances.)

Subsequently, Pascale became the head fabric buyer for women's ready-to-wear at Hermès, which led to her becoming a press attaché and later head of advertising and public relations. These assignments were followed by her creating a department of exhibitions. Subsequently, she set up and directed the shop-windows department.

Mid-career
In 2002, Jean-Louis Dumas made Mussard his assistant and the delegate artistic director alongside Pierre-Alexis Dumas.

Until her activities as the co-artistic director ceased in 2011, Mussard had been in charge of the accessories and leather-goods sectors of the firm, which still include the "Kelly" and "Birkin" bags. Mussard worked toward bringing the firm into a sustainable future.

She and Pierre-Alexis Dumas, who is twelve years her junior, had been successful in dismissing the naysayers claim that the brand would fall from grace when her uncle and Pierre-Alexis's father, Jean-Louis Dumas, died in 2010.

Accolades include Mussard's being designated one of the "Ten Women to Watch in Europe" by The Wall Street Journal in 2008.

Present activities
In 2009, Mussard, who is the mother of three sons, two of which are twins (Maxime, Dimitri, Alexandre) asserted that modern luxury is a "reinvention" and is becoming more sustainably focused. She is referencing her current duties as the director of the "Petit h" division of Hermès that some call a labo-atelier. However, "we are not an art gallery", she asserts. The endeavor is an uptake on recycling. For example, discarded animal skins from the "Kelly" and "Birkin" bags, other leatherwear, and various elements, such as handles, hardware, and discarded ceramics, are being reborn as other objects with new lives.

"My playground is Hermès... Let’s see what we can reinvent", says Mussard, who grew up as something of an Eloise in the company's ateliers according to Time magazine's Marion Hume.

References

1957 births
Living people
French businesspeople
Alumni of European Business School London